The 2017–18 Norfolk State Spartans men's basketball team represented Norfolk State University during the 2017–18 NCAA Division I men's basketball season. The Spartans, led by fifth-year coach Robert Jones, played their home games at the Joseph G. Echols Memorial Hall in Norfolk, Virginia as members of the Mid-Eastern Athletic Conference. They finished the season 14–19, 11–5 in MEAC play to finish in a tie for fourth place. As the No. 5 seed in the MEAC tournament, they defeated Maryland Eastern Shore before losing to North Carolina A&T in the quarterfinals.

Previous season
The Spartans finished the 2016–17 season 17–17, 12–4 in MEAC play to finish in second place. They defeated South Carolina State and Howard to advance to the Championship game of the MEAC tournament where they lost to North Carolina Central. They were invited to the CollegeInsider.com Tournament where they lost in the first round to Liberty.

Roster

Schedule and results

|-
!colspan=9 style=|Exhibition

|-
!colspan=9 style=| Regular season

|-
!colspan=9 style=| MEAC tournament

References

Norfolk State Spartans men's basketball seasons
Norfolk State
Norfolk State Spartans
Norfolk State Spartans